Rosoy may refer to:
 Rosoy, Oise
 Rosoy, Yonne